The Independent Women's Football League (IWFL) was the first Women's American football league established by women players for women players. The league was founded in 2000, began play in 2001, and played its last season in 2018.  Members of the original roster of the Austin Outlaws were the league's founders. Following the establishment of the league as a separate entity from the team, former outlaws players Laurie Frederick, Jaime Bailey and Sandra Plato became the original IWFL executive council. 

The players were amateur/semi pro and had to cover part of their expenses.

2019 Season Teams

Central Division

Pacific Division

Expansion 2020/ Inactive Teams

Former IWFL teams playing elsewhere
Arlington Impact – played in the IWFL from 2012–14, now in Women's Football Alliance.
Austin Outlaws – now in Women's Football Alliance.
D.C. Divas – played in the IWFL from 2007–2010, now in Women's Football Alliance.
Houston Energy – now in Women's Football Alliance.
Kansas City Storm – played in the IWFL from 2005–2007, currently playing in the Women's Xtreme Football League of Kansas/Oklahoma (WXFL).
Keystone Assault – played in the IWFL from 2013–2014, now in United States Women's Football League.
New York Knockout – played in the IWFL from 2013–2014, now in Women's Football Alliance
Oregon Hawks formerly Eugene LadyHawks– played in the IWFL in 2018, now in Women's Football Alliance.
San Diego Surge – played in the IWFL, now in Women's National Football Conference.
Minnesota Vixen - played in the IWFL from 2009-2019, now in Women's Football Alliance.
Seattle Majestics – played in the IWFL, now in Women's National Football Conference.
Texas Elite Spartans – played in the IWFL, now in Women's National Football Conference.
Utah Falconz – played in the IWFL, now in Women's National Football Conference.

Champions

Tier I
 2001 — Austin Outlaws – Champion by record
 2002 — New York Sharks 24, Austin Outlaws 4
 2003 — Sacramento Sirens 41, New York Sharks 30
 2004 — Sacramento Sirens 29, New York Sharks 27
 2005 — Sacramento Sirens 9, Atlanta Xplosion 7
 2006 — Atlanta Xplosion 21, Detroit Demolition 14
 2007 — Detroit Demolition 17, Atlanta Xplosion 7
 2008 — Dallas Diamonds 35, Chicago Force 29
 2009 — Kansas City Tribe 21, D.C. Divas 18
 2010 — Boston Militia 39, Sacramento Sirens 7
 2011 — Atlanta Ravens 24, California Quake 22
 2012 — Montreal Blitz 28, Sacramento Sirens 27
 2013 — Carolina Phoenix 14, Houston Energy 0
 2014 — Pittsburgh Passion 41, Houston Energy 7
 2015 — Pittsburgh Passion 41, Utah Falconz 37
 2016 — Utah Falconz 49, Minnesota Vixen 6
 2017 — Utah Falconz 35, Austin Yellow Jackets 18
 2018 — Houston Energy 34, Nevada Storm 0

Tier II
 2008 — Montreal Blitz 26, Clarksville Fox 6
 2009 — Wisconsin Warriors 42, Montreal Blitz 14
 2010 — Montreal Blitz 9, Bay Area Bandits 2
 2011 — Seattle Majestics 20, New England Intensity 0

Founders Bowl (Tier II Championship)
 2012 — Carolina Phoenix 27, Portland Shockwave 0
 2013 — Montreal Blitz 55, Arlington Impact 8 
 2014 — Madison Blaze 31, Baltimore Nighthawks 14
 2015 — Carolina Phoenix 32, Madison Blaze 9
 2016 — Carolina Phoenix 20, Carson Bobcats 12
 2017 — Colorado Freeze 27, San Antonio Regulators 6
 2018 — San Antonio Regulators 30, Tulsa Threat 0

Affiliate Bowl (Tier III Championship)
 2012 — Carolina Queens 18, Colorado Sting 0
 2013 — Carolina Queens 28, San Antonio Regulators 14
 2014 — Carolina Queens 28, Minnesota Vixens 22
 2015 — Detroit Pride 24, San Antonio Regulators 22
 2016 — Maine Mayhem 48, Knoxville Lightning 0

See also
 American football in the United States
 Women's Football in the United States
 List of leagues of American football

References

External links
 @Womens.Football.League
 The Women's Pro Football Networking Group

 
Women's American football leagues
Sports leagues established in 2000